The Big Traverse Bay Historic District  is a historic district located east of Lake Linden, Michigan at the mouth of the Traverse River.  It was listed on the National Register of Historic Places in and designated a Michigan State Historic Site in 1975.

History

The site on which the Big Traverse Bay Historic District now stands was originally a logging camp owned by the Hebard Lumber Company, dating from the last two decades of the 19th century.  A substantial number of Finnish emigres moved into the area, working in the lumber, mining, or fishing industries.  By 1920, Big Traverse Bay had developed into a primarily fishing community.  in the 1950s, construction of a breakwater and changes to the harbor resulted in the demolition of a number of houses, as well as a footbridge across the river.  The community remains an active, and relatively isolated, fishing community.

Description
Big Traverse Bay is a small Finnish fishing community located on a peninsula and adjacent mainland at the mouth of the Traverse River on Lake Superior.  The community includes approximately 40 small, single-story, gable-roofed houses with aluminum siding an undeveloped yards.  Vintage gasoline pumps, net reels, cedar shake-covered fishing buildings, ice houses and saunas are still in use.

References

Houses on the National Register of Historic Places in Michigan
Historic districts in Houghton County, Michigan
Michigan State Historic Sites in Houghton County
Houses in Houghton County, Michigan
Historic districts on the National Register of Historic Places in Michigan
National Register of Historic Places in Houghton County, Michigan